Amos Chafee Barstow (April 30, 1813 – September 5, 1894) was an American politician and businessperson. He served as the Mayor of Providence, Rhode Island, for one term, 1852–1853.

Early life
Barstow was born in Providence. He attended public schools as well as three terms in private school.

Business career
Barstow was involved in several businesses, including banking; he was president of the City Bank and helped establish the Mechanics Savings Bank. He was the first president of the Providence YMCA, and built the Providence Music Hall. But Barstow's main business venture was the Barstow Stove Company, which made cooking stoves. His company won a medal at the 1873 World's Fair in Vienna for having the best stove.

Political career
Barstow was active in the Temperance movement. While otherwise a Whig, in 1847, he ran for Mayor on the Temperance Party ticket and lost. In 1851 Barstow was elected to the Rhode Island General Assembly, and on January 27, 1852, Barstow delivered a prominent speech to the Rhode Island House of Representatives in favor of Rhode Island's Maine law, which was one of the early temperance bills in the United States (so named because it was modeled after an 1851 temperance law in Maine). In May 1852, Rhode Island's "Maine Law" was passed, making the sale and consumption of liquor illegal in Maine for eleven years.

Barstow was inaugurated Mayor of Providence on June 7, 1852, and served one term.

After serving as mayor, Barstow returned to the Rhode Island General Assembly. Barstow was chairman of the committee which planned the current Providence City Hall. In 1855, it was Barstow who recommended the site where City Hall was later built. He also became active in the abolition movement, and gave various speeches predicting the end of slavery.

In 1875, President Grant appointed Barstow to the Board of Indian Commissioners, and he spent much of his time visiting the American West.

Personal life
Barstow was an avid Congregationalist. He attended Beneficent Congregational Church starting 1832, and helped found the High Street Congregational Church in 1834, where he became deacon. He married Eemline Mumford Eames on May 28, 1834, and had seven children; five girls and two boys.

References

External links
 Barstow at Providence City website
 

1895 deaths
1813 births
People from Providence, Rhode Island
Members of the Rhode Island General Assembly
Mayors of Providence, Rhode Island
Rhode Island Whigs
19th-century American politicians
Burials at Swan Point Cemetery
American temperance activists
19th-century American businesspeople